

Ventspils Lighthouse (Latvian: Ventspils bāka) — a lighthouse located in Ventspils on the Latvian coast of the Baltic Sea.

History
The lighthouse is located on the south breakwater of Ventspils port and harbour. Before that, the lighthouse was located on the left bank of the river Venta, which was built in 1897 and destroyed during World War I by the retreating Russian army leaving the town of Ventspils. Both these constructions were not originally lighthouses – although they did have luminous elements, but similarly to factory chimneys and high church spires in the local area, they served as navigational marks for sailors which travelled into the port of Ventspils.

See also

 List of lighthouses in Latvia

References

Lighthouses completed in 1934
Resort architecture in Latvia
Lighthouses in Latvia
1934 establishments in Latvia